This is a list of museums in Algeria.

See also 
 List of museums

Algeria education-related lists
Algeria
 
Lists of buildings and structures in Algeria
Museums
Algeria